Aneurinibacillus migulanus is a bacterium from the genus of Aneurinibacillus. Aneurinibacillus migulanus produces the antibiotic Gramicidin S. Genome size of Aneurinibacillus migulanus strain TP115 is 5,556,554 bp.

References

Paenibacillaceae
Bacteria described in 1993